Hedyosmum purpurascens is a species of plant in the Chloranthaceae family. It is endemic to Ecuador.  Its natural habitat is subtropical or tropical moist montane forests.

References

Flora of Ecuador
purpureascens
Vulnerable plants
Taxonomy articles created by Polbot